Alfred J. Kennedy (August 13, 1877 in Whitestone, Queens County, New York – July 28, 1944 in Whitestone, Queens, New York City) was an American politician from New York.

Life
He was the son of Martin Kennedy and Elizabeth (Rout) Kennedy (1860–1941). After Martin's death, Elizabeth married John J. Clancy (1844–1905), and they had six children.

Alfred J. Kennedy fought as a corporal of the 22nd New York Infantry (U.S. Army) in the Spanish–American War. He married Annie Hanlon (1876–1953), and they had three children.

Kennedy was a member of the New York State Assembly (Queens Co., 2nd D.) in 1911, 1912 and 1913; and was Chairman of the Committee on Privileges and Elections in 1913. He resigned his seat on May 12, 1913, to accept an appointment as Postmaster of Flushing, Queens. In the 1920 United States House of Representatives election, he unsuccessfully ran as the Democratic candidate for New York's 1st congressional district.

On December 22, 1922, Alfred J. Kennedy, his half-brother Robert R. Clancy (1901–1972), and his son Francis Kennedy, were indicted by a federal grand jury for violating the postal laws. Kennedy was accused of having leaked the questions (which had been sent by mail) for a civil service test.

He was again a member of the State Assembly (Queens Co., 3rd D.) in 1923, 1924, 1925 and 1926.

He was a member of the New York State Senate (3rd D.) from 1927 to 1930, sitting in the 150th, 151st, 152nd and 153rd New York State Legislatures. He filed his resignation on April 11, effective on May 1, 1930, and was appointed Public Administrator of Queens.

In August 1937, he was elected Commander-in-Chief of the United Spanish War Veterans.

He died on July 28, 1944; and was buried at the Long Island National Cemetery.

In 1950, an Alfred J. Kennedy Memorial was erected on the corner of Main and Northern streets in Queens.

In 1952, Public School No. 193 in Queens was named for him Alfred J. Kennedy School.

References

External links

1877 births
1944 deaths
Democratic Party New York (state) state senators
People from Whitestone, Queens
Democratic Party members of the New York State Assembly
New York (state) postmasters
Burials at Long Island National Cemetery